Natwara is a village located in Newai Tehsil of Tonk district, Rajasthan, India.

References

Villages in India
Villages in Rajasthan